is a Japanese film director and screenwriter. He is known for his action and yakuza films, including Score (1995), Junk (2000), and the Gun Crazy series (2002–03), as well as for directing Wangan Midnight: The Movie (2009), a film adaptation of the manga series of the same name.

Early life and education
Muroga was born on 18 May 1964 in Osaka Prefecture, Japan. He attended the School of Commerce at Meiji University.

Career
In 1987, Muroga's independently produced work HELP ME! won the Grand Prix at the Business Jump Video Awards sponsored by Shueisha. He made his directorial debut with the direct-to-video film Blowback: Midnight Gangsters (1990), followed by Blowback 2 (1991). His first theatrically released film was the action film Score (1995), distributed by Shochiku. In 2000, Muroga wrote and directed the zombie film Junk.

Selected filmography

References

Bibliography

External links
 

1964 births
Japanese film directors
Japanese screenwriters
People from Osaka Prefecture
Living people
20th-century Japanese people